Olympic Club de Safi is a Moroccan football club based in Safi.

Vainqueur coupe du Maroc 1950

Honours
Moroccan League Second Division: 1
2004
Moroccan Cup: Finalist
2016

Current squad

Managers
 Alain Geiger (April 27, 2007 – Dec 3, 2007)
 Youssef Lemrini (Jan 10, 2013 – June 20, 2013)
 Badou Zaki (July 1, 2013 – Dec 17, 2013)
 Youssef Fertout (Dec 24, 2013 – June 19, 2014)
 Hicham El Idrissi (June 21, 2014– Mars 10 2014)
 Youssef Fertout (Mars 10, 2013 – August 29, 2014)
 Aziz El Amri (August 29, 2014 – April 20, 2016)
 Hicham Dmii (April 20, 2016 – August 15, 2020)
 Mohamed AlKaysser (April 20, 2016 – August 15, 2020)
 Abdelhadi Sektioui (March 8, 2020 – unknown)
 Amine El Karma (January 20, 2021 – May 5, 2021)' 
 Saida Chiba (May 11, 2021 – July 1, 2021)' 
 Faouzi Jamal (July 7, 2021 –

Sponsors
 OCP
 Fitco
 Ain Soltane

Sport equipment

 Bang Sports

References

External links

[ Official Website]
Fans website

Football clubs in Morocco
Association football clubs established in 1921
Sports clubs in Morocco
1921 establishments in Morocco
Safi, Morocco